Gravatnet is a lake in the municipality of Sirdal in Agder county, Norway. The lake lies immediately south of the lake Valevatn, which flows out into Gravatnet. The water in Gravatnet is stopped by a dam on the south side.

See also
List of lakes in Norway

References

Lakes of Agder
Sirdal